JDS Yoshino (DE-223) was the tenth ship of the s of Japan Maritime Self-Defense Force.

Development and design 
The main anti-submarine (ASW) weapon was changed from the M/50  ASW rocket launcher to the ASROC anti-submarine missile. The octuple launcher for ASROC was stationed at the mid-deck, and the entire ship design was prescribed by this stationing.

Construction and career
Yoshino was laid down on 28 September 1973 at Mitsui Engineering & Shipbuilding, Tamano and launched on 22 August 1974. The vessel was commissioned on 6 February 1975 into the 7th Escort Corps of the Kure District Force.

On May 11, 1976, the 7th Escort Corps was renamed the 36th Escort Corps of the Kure District Force.

On March 19, 1986, the 36th Escort Corps was abolished and transferred to the 38th Escort Corps of the Kure District Force.

Joined Maizuru District Force 31st Escort Corps on July 1, 1987. The home port was transferred to Maizuru base.

On August 29, 1987, the Soviet Navy Ognevoy-class destroyer Osmotritelny was visually recognized about 55 km northeast of Rebun Island, Hokkaido.

On December 12, 1989, he was transferred to Yokosuka District Force 33rd Escort Corps, and the home port was transferred to Yokosuka.

On August 1, 1995, she was transferred to the 36th Escort Corps of the Kure District Force, and the home port was transferred to Kure again.

Joined the 22nd Escort Corps of the Kure District Force on March 24, 1997.

Removed from the register on May 15, 2001.

References

1974 ships
Ships built by Mitsui Engineering and Shipbuilding
Chikugo-class destroyer escorts